De La Mix Tape: Remixes, Rarities and Classics is a 2004 De La Soul compilation album from Rhino Records. It is similar to the A Tribe Called Quest compilation album Hits, Rarities & Remixes.

Personnel 

Karen Ahmed – Project Assistant
Skeff Anselm – Producer
Vanessa Atkins – Project Assistant
Badmarsh & Shri – Remixing
Barry Benson – Compilation Producer
Joe Buck – Cover Design
Emily Cagan – Project Assistant
Chairman Mao – Liner Notes
Reggie Collins – Annotation
Pic Conley – Flute
Chris Conway – Mixing
DaBeatminerz – Producer
De La Soul – Arranger, Producer, Remixing, Mixing
DJ Honda – Producer
DJ Joc Max – Remixing
DJ Spinna – Remixing
Sue Faber – Mixing
Cory Frye – Project Assistant
Leigh Hall – Project Assistant
Dan Hersch – Remastering
Troy Hightower – Mixing
Jay Dee – Producer, Remixing
Masaki Koike – Art Direction, Design
Tim Latham – Mixing
Suzanne Love – Project Assistant
April Milek – Project Assistant
Mos Def – Vocals
Randy Perry – Project Assistant
Steve Pokorny – Remastering
Bob Power – Mixing
Prince Paul – Arranger, Producer, Mixing
Rockwilder – Producer
Gladys Sanchez – Project Assistant
Tim Scanlin – Project Assistant
Glenn Schwartz – Project Assistant
Dorothy Stefanski – Editorial Supervision
Truth Enola – Vocals
Diana Washburn – Project Assistant
Mason Williams – Project Assistant
Yankee B. – Vocals

References

De La Soul albums
Hip hop compilation albums
Albums produced by J Dilla
Albums produced by Prince Paul (producer)
Albums produced by Rockwilder
Albums produced by Da Beatminerz
2004 compilation albums
Hip hop remix albums
2004 remix albums
Rhino Records compilation albums
Rhino Records remix albums